8110 may refer to:

 Nokia 8110, a mobile phone released in 1996
 Nokia 8110 4G, a mobile phone released in 2018
 BS 8110, British Standard for the design and construction of concrete structures
 BlackBerry Pearl 8110, a mobile phone released in 2006
 Huawei U8110, a mobile phone released in 2018